Jalgaon Jamod is a town in Buldhana district of  Indian state of Maharashtra.

History 
The name Jalgaon is a combination of two Marathi words, Jal and Gaon, that mean village of water. This name came because of heavy water resources around the town. The name 'Jalgaon Jamod' developed because of a smaller village called 'Jamod' near to Jalgaon. Mughal emperors gave the name ‘Jamod’  after 1630 AD, when Mughal emperor Shahjahan's wife Mumtaz Mahal was traveling with Shah Jahan's earlier military campaigns. She started facing pregnancy complications in Jamod which led to death in the city of Burhanpur near Jalgaon Jamod. After this incident Mughals started calling the village Ja-e-Maut (Place of Death). Ja-e-Maut was a Persian word later called Ja-maut, Ja-mod or Jamod by locals.
As per Ain-e-Akbari, it was a Pargana town in the Sarkar (then district) of Narnala of Berar Subah.  "Raja Bhartuhari", King of Bhoj Nagri(Bhopal) had samadhi at Jalgaon Jamod.

In August 1905 it was part of what was then Akola District and was transferred to Buldhana district along with Khamgaon tehsil. The municipality of Jalgaon was established in 1931.

Geography
The town is situated at the base of the Satpura Range, about 10 km from Satpuda. Purna is the largest river in the tehsil which is also the largest in the district. Rajura and Gorada are famous natural dams in the Satpuda Ranges. They are enriched with the green beauty of Satpuda rows.

Borders:
In the east is Sangrampur tehsil.
In the west is Muktainagar Tehsil in Jalgaon Khandesh District.
In the north is Burhanpur District, State of Madhya Pradesh.
In the south is Nandura tehsil.

Satpuda Range 
In Satpuda Range, the way consists of 3 famous points called 1st mori, 2nd mori, and the last one 3rd mori. The third mori is Aam-Paanee, where there are two beautiful falls (origin of a river) and one wall we called "Satpudaa wall".  This town has a dam called Godada Dam, having a beautiful overflow called Dudh ganga. In the Satpuda Range you can see beautiful places with falls, scenes and nature: Amba barwa, Mageri Mahadeo (cave), Jatashankar (fall), Umbardev (Amarnaath), Jamupaanee (fall), Badalkhora (medicine plants and fall), Devdhree (nature), Wari Hanumaan (Shree Hanumaanji Temple, Hanuman Sagar Dam), Kakanwada (trymbak), Treeveni (confluence of three rivers), and Mahilgad (mailgad). These are the places having their own identity, and all come within a range of 40 km from "Satpudaa Nagree Jalgaon Jamod". Nature helping in growing the beauty of the town. One of the best nature sites for photos. Seeing the complete site should take almost 4–5 days.

Demographics

Transport
 National Highway 161H (India) From Nandura at terminating National Highway 161G (India)
 National Highway 161G (India) From Patur - Balapur - Shegaon - Sangrampur - Jalgaon Jamod - Khaknar of M.P.
 Khandvi - Muktainagar road going via Kurha. State Highway 195 connects Jalgaon Jamod
 MH SH 24 via Sangrampur - Telhara
 Nandura on Bhusawal - Badnera section of Bhusawal Division of Central Railway is a nearby railway station.
 Aurangabad Airport is a nearest domestic airport at distance 223 K.M. Dr. Babasaheb Ambedkar International Airport, Nagpur it is nearest international airport at distance 327 K.M.

Education

Politics
Sanjay Shriram Kute of BJP is the Member of Vidhan Sabha (4th Term). He is also district president for BJP.

Places of interest 
 Dhanora (Mahasiddha)  :There is an ancient temple and Samadhi of Shri Mahasidham Maharaj in one of the 84 SIDDHA in Dhanora Nagari, which is situated in the holy city of Satpura, situated about 06 km away from Jalgaon Jamod. This eight-day fair is the second largest in Buldhana district.

References

External links 

Cities and towns in Buldhana district
Talukas in Maharashtra